Bryan Fitzpatrick McGuigan (6 September 1880 – 8 September 1954) was an Australian rules footballer who played with Melbourne in the Victorian Football League (VFL).

Notes

External links 

 

1880 births
1954 deaths
Australian rules footballers from Victoria (Australia)
Melbourne Football Club players